The Edgewood Tahoe Resort is a golf resort in the western United States, on the south shore of Lake Tahoe in Stateline, Nevada. The venue has hosted the 1985 U.S. Senior Open and the annual American Century Championship since 1990. 

The site where Edgewood now stands was previously part of a ranch adjacent to Friday's Station, the historic 19th Century Pony Express station and inn. The Park family bought the ranch in 1896 to raise cattle, and in the 1960s they decided to build a golf course on their property. The golf course was originally designed by George Fazio and opened in 1968. George's nephew Tom Fazio has since renovated the now  course from time to time.

The resort hosted the NHL Outdoors at Lake Tahoe series on February 20–21, 2021. The Colorado Avalanche defeated the Vegas Golden Knights 3-2 on February 20, and the Boston Bruins defeated the Philadelphia Flyers 7-3 the next day. The series served as a replacement for the Winter Classic and Stadium Series for that season, both which were cancelled due to the COVID-19 pandemic.

Scorecard

References

External links
 

Golf clubs and courses in Nevada
1968 establishments in Nevada
Sports venues completed in 1968